MTCC may refer to:

 Metro Toronto Convention Centre
 McCormick Tribune Campus Center, Chicago
 Maldives Transport and Contracting Company, a public company operating public ferry services in the Maldives